Fanefjord Church (Fanefjord kirke) is on the Danish island of Møn. It is located in an open setting overlooking the Baltic Sea inlet of Fanefjord between Store Damme and Hårbølle. Standing on the top of a small hill, the church's red-tiled roof and whitewashed walls can be seen from considerable distances, whatever the direction. The interior is of particular historical interest, in view of the many frescos dating back to the 13th and 16th centuries and Fanefjord Church is considered the most famous attraction on Møn.

History 
The site itself is of considerable historic interest. A few hundred meters to the south of the church there is a particularly long barrow, Grønsalen, the supposed burial ground of queen Fane and her husband king Grøn Jæger  who according to local folklore, lived some 4,000 years ago.
 
The church's original 7 m high nave dates back to the second half of the 13th century. The cross vaults in the nave were added around 1300. In about 1500, the porch and tower were completed and the choir was built around 1660.
In 1825, the church was bought by the Klintholm Estate which maintained ownership for almost 100 years.

It may appear surprising that such a large church was built at a time (ca. 1250 AD) when the parish only had about 300 inhabitants. One explanation may be that there was considerable trade through the fjord with  ports of the Hanseatic League. The traders may well have contributed to the construction, both financially and by helping with the construction.

Frescos 

For many generations, Fanefjord's Church frescos were hidden under a covering of plaster. After frescos had been discovered at the end of the 19th century in Møn's Elmelunde Church, those in Fanefjord were painstakingly uncovered from 1932 to 1934 under the guidance of the National Museum. In 2009, major restoration work was completed on the frescos, revealing their original colours and impact.

The earliest frescos, on the triumphal arch, were painted around 1350. They depict the four evangelists, as well as St Christopher and St George. The most famous frescos are however those dating back to about 1500 which cover large areas of the church's ceiling and upper walls. In the so-called Biblia pauperum style, they present many of the most popular stories from the Old and New Testaments.

Elmelunde Master
The artist, who can be identified by the emblem he included in the decorations, is known simply as the Elmelunde Master  (Elmelundemesteren), as it was he and his team who also painted the frescos in Elmelunde Church as well as Keldby Church. It is probable that there were several artists in the Elmelunde workshop who collaborated in decorating churches in the area as other emblems and various in style have been observed.

The warm colours ranging from dark red and russet to yellow, green, grey and black are distinctive. Another typical feature is the expressionless faces of the sleepy-eyed people, turned to the left or right while their bodies face the front. All the images, including the surrounding stonework, are decorated with ornaments such as stars, plants and trees. The images themselves appear to have been inspired partly from block-prints from a Dutch or German Biblia Pauperum, a book containing some 40 pages of drawings depicting stories from the Bible.

Other sources probably included the Bible itself, legends, apocryphal writings and other illustrations. Initially, the wall paintings appear to have covered the entire church including the lower parts of the walls which are now whitewashed. Traces of work in these areas have been found but the images were not sufficiently clear to warrant restoration.

Other features
The church contains a number of other interesting features:

The choir
The choir, which was renovated in the 17th century in a different, but compatible style, consists of an impressive altarpiece, the original candlesticks and a new altar.

The pulpit
The ornate pulpit is from about 1645 and bears King Christian IV's emblem. Among the carved figures are Christ, Jacob, St Peter and one of the apostles.

The organ
A new organ built by Frobenius & Sønner with 10 stops, two keyboards and a pedalboard, was installed in 1998.

Graveyard
Notable people buried in the graveyard include:
 Johan Paludan (1756-1821), author, journalist, editor and priest
 Bent Barfoed (1920-2007), film director, film producer and animator
 Eva Gredal (1927-1995), politician
 Henning Christiansen (1932-2008), composer and professor and artist
 Kaj Otto Gredal (1925-1992), civil servant

Gallery

See also
Church frescos in Denmark
Keldby Church

References

Other solurces
 Pastor Helge Buus: Fanefjord Kirke,  Fanefjord menighedsråd, Askeby, 1978, Fanefjord menighedsråd, 19 p.
 Birgit Als Hansen: De Mønske Kirker, Møns Turistforening, Stege, 1967, 11 p. (translated 1976 as The churches of Møn)
 Annett Scavenius: Elmelundemestern i Fanefjord Kirke, Forlaget Vandkunsten, 2010, 121 p. .

External links
 History of Fanefjord Church from the parish website. Retrieved 5 August 2009.
 Local History pages of the Fanefjord Sogns Grundejer- & Beboerforening (in Danish). Retrieved 30 July 2007.
 Elmelundemesteren from the Insula Moenia site. Retrieved 1 August 2007.

Churches in Vordingborg Municipality
Churches in the Diocese of Roskilde
13th-century churches in Denmark
Fresco paintings in Denmark
Church frescos in Denmark
Møn
Lutheran churches converted from Roman Catholicism